A trundle bed (or truckle bed) is a low, wheeled bed that is stored under a twin/single bed and can be rolled out for use by visitors or as just another bed.

A pop-up trundle bed can be raised to meet the height of the normal bed, effectively creating a wider sleeping surface when positioned side-by-side.

Gallery

References

See also
 Bunk bed
 Murphy bed

Beds
Space-saving furniture